The 23rd Young Artist Awards ceremony, presented by the Young Artist Association, honored excellence of young performers under the age of 21 in the fields of film, television, theater and music for the year 2001, and took place on April 7, 2002 at the Sportsmen's Lodge in Studio City, California.

Established in 1978 by long-standing Hollywood Foreign Press Association member, Maureen Dragone, the Young Artist Association was the first organization to establish an awards ceremony specifically set to recognize and award the contributions of performers under the age of 21 in the fields of film, television, theater and music.

Categories
★ Bold indicates the winner in each category.

Best Performance in a Feature Film

Best Performance in a Feature Film: Leading Young Actor
★ Anton Yelchin - Hearts in Atlantis - Warner Bros.
Blake Foster - Kids World - Blue Steel Releasing
Trevor Morgan - The Glass House - Columbia Pictures
Camden Munson - In the Bedroom - Miramax
Haley Joel Osment - A.I. Artificial Intelligence - DreamWorks
Alexander Pollock - Cats & Dogs - Warner Bros.

Best Performance in a Feature Film: Leading Young Actress
★ (tie) Scarlett Johansson - An American Rhapsody - Paramount Classics
★ (tie) Emma Watson - Harry Potter and the Sorcerer's Stone - Warner Bros.
Hayden Panettiere - Joe Somebody - 20th Century Fox
Evan Rachel Wood - Little Secrets - TriStar Pictures

Best Performance in a Feature Film: Supporting Young Actor
★ Jake Thomas - A.I. Artificial Intelligence - DreamWorks
Justin Berfield - Max Keeble's Big Move - Walt Disney
Freddie Boath - The Mummy Returns - Universal
Serge Cockburn - Crocodile Dundee in Los Angeles - Universal
Tom Felton - Harry Potter and the Sorcerer's Stone - Warner Bros.
Matthew O'Leary - Domestic Disturbance - Paramount
Will Rothhaar - Hearts in Atlantis - Warner Bros.

Best Performance in a Feature Film: Supporting Young Actress
★ Brooke Anne Smith - Max Keeble's Big Move - Walt Disney
Mika Boorem - Hearts in Atlantis - Warner Bros.
Irene Gorovaia - The Royal Tenenbaums - Touchstone
Alakina Mann - The Others - Miramax
Alexa Vega - Spy Kids - Miramax
Mae Whitman - An American Rhapsody - Paramount Classics

Best Performance in a Feature Film: Young Actor Age Ten or Under
★ James Bentley - The Others - Miramax
Anthony Borrows - Liam - Lions Gate Films
Angus T. Jones - See Spot Run - Warner Bros.
Jonah Meyerson - The Royal Tenenbaums - Touchstone
Grant Rosenmeyer - The Royal Tenenbaums - Touchstone

Best Performance in a Feature Film: Young Actress Age Ten or Under
★ Dakota Fanning - I Am Sam - New Line Cinema
Kelly Endresz-Banlaki - An American Rhapsody - Paramount Classics
Skye McCole Bartusiak - Riding in Cars with Boys - Sony Pictures
Steffani Brass - Dawg - Gold Circle Films
Brittany Tiplady - The Pledge - Warner Bros.

Best Performance in a TV Movie

Best Performance in a TV Movie (Comedy or Drama): Leading Young Actor
★ Ryan Merriman - Dangerous Child - Lifetime
Nicholas Braun - Walter and Henry - Showtime
Rory Culkin - Off Season - Showtime
Bobby Edner - The Day the World Ended - HBO
Alex D. Linz - The Jennie Project - Disney Channel
Trevor O'Brien - Motocrossed - Disney Channel
Josh Zuckerman - 'Twas the Night - Disney Channel

Best Performance in a TV Movie (Comedy or Drama): Leading Young Actress
★ Kelsey Keel - My Louisiana Sky - Showtime
Kimberly J. Brown - Halloweentown II: Kalabar's Revenge - Disney Channel
Kerry Duff - Jett Jackson: The Movie - Disney Channel
Chloe Rose Lattanzi - My Louisiana Sky - Showtime
Ashley Rose Orr - Child Star: The Shirley Temple Story - ABC
Alison Pill - What Girls Learn - Showtime
Shadia Simmons - Zenon: The Zequel - Disney Channel

Best Performance in a TV Movie (Comedy or Drama): Supporting Young Actor
★ Robert Clark - Prancer Returns - USA
J. Adam Brown - My Horrible Year! - Showtime
Michael Cera - My Louisiana Sky - Showtime
Marc Donato - Dangerous Child - Lifetime
Kyle Kassardjian - They Call Me Sirr - Showtime
Max Morrow - Sister Mary Explains It All - Showtime
Scott Terra - Motocrossed - Disney Channel
Joey Zimmerman - Halloweentown II: Kalabar's Revenge - Disney Channel

Best Performance in a TV Movie (Comedy or Drama): Supporting Young Actress
★ Brenda Grate - 'Twas the Night - Disney Channel
Hallee Hirsh - Taking Back Our Town - Lifetime
Tamara Hope - What Girls Learn - Showtime

Best Performance in a TV Movie (Comedy or Drama): Young Actor Age 10 or Under
★ Gavin Fink - Prancer Returns - USA
Andrew Van Hise - Two For One - PAX
Adam Schurman - The Sons of Mistletoe - CBS

Best Performance in a TV Movie (Comedy or Drama): Young Actor Age 10 or Under
★ Hayley Lochner - Prancer Returns - USA
Ashley Edner - Rain - United General
Brittany Tiplady - The Sports Pages - Showtime

Best Performance in a TV Drama Series

Best Performance in a TV Drama Series: Leading Young Actor
★ Eric Ian Goldberg - The Education of Max Bickford - CBS
David Gallagher - 7th Heaven - WB
Tyler Hynes - Tales from the Neverending Story - Hallmark Channel
Robert Iler - The Sopranos - HBO
Alex Wrathell - Pit Pony - CBS / Cochran Entertainment

Best Performance in a TV Drama Series: Leading Young Actress
★ Kirsten Storms - Days of Our Lives - NBC
Ashley Lyn Cafagna - The Bold and the Beautiful - CBS
Lindsay Felton - Caitlin's Way - Nickelodeon
Elliot Page - Pit Pony - CBS / Cochran Entertainment
Brittany Snow - Guiding Light - CBS

Best Performance in a TV Drama Series: Supporting Young Actor
★ Jesse McCartney - All My Children - ABC
Jared Daperis - Ponderosa - PAX
Scotty Leavenworth - Philly - ABC

Best Performance in a TV Drama Series: Supporting Young Actress
★ Keiko Agena - Gilmore Girls - WB
Alexis Bledel - Gilmore Girls - WB
Chea Courtney - Passions - NBC
Mackenzie Rosman - 7th Heaven - WB
Karle Warren - Judging Amy - CBS

Best Performance in a TV Drama Series: Guest Starring Young Actor
★ J.B. Gaynor - Touched by an Angel - CBS
Marc Donato - Twice in a Lifetime - PAX
Bobby Edner - Charmed - WB
Marc John Jefferies - The Practice - ABC
Erik Knudsen - The Guardian - CBS
Jesse Plemons - The Guardian - CBS
Shawn Pyfrom - The Division - Lifetime
Corey Sevier - Twice in a Lifetime - PAX

Best Performance in a TV Drama Series: Guest Starring Young Actress
★ Jamie Renée Smith - ER - NBC
Daveigh Chase - Touched by an Angel - CBS
Jamie Lauren - The Practice - ABC
Ashley Edner - 7th Heaven - WB
Hallee Hirsh - ER - NBC
Cassie Steele - Relic Hunter - Paramount

Best Performance in a TV Comedy Series

Best Performance in a TV Comedy Series: Leading Young Actor
★ Frankie Muniz - Malcolm in the Middle - FOX
Ryan Cooley - Degrassi: The Next Generation - CTV / Epitome Pictures
Jake Goldsbie - Degrassi: The Next Generation - CTV / Epitome Pictures
Shia LaBeouf - Even Stevens - Disney Channel
Jonathan Malen - Screech Owls - Youth Television
A.J. Trauth - Even Stevens - Disney Channel

Best Performance in a TV Comedy Series: Leading Young Actress
★ Christy Carlson Romano - Even Stevens - Disney Channel
Hilary Duff - Lizzie McGuire - Disney Channel
Brie Larson - Raising Dad - WB
Alia Shawkat - State of Grace - ABC
Michelle Trachtenberg - Truth or Scare - Discovery Kids Channel
Mae Whitman - State of Grace - ABC

Best Performance in a TV Comedy Series: Supporting Young Actor
★ Timmy Fitzpatrick - Grounded for Life - FOX
Matt Adams - Big Kids - Noggin
Mitch Holleman - Reba - WB
Steven Anthony Lawrence - Even Stevens - Disney Channel
Tyler Posey - Doc - PAX
Craig Lamar Traylor - Malcolm in the Middle - FOX

Best Performance in a TV Comedy Series: Supporting Young Actress
★ Lauren Frost - Even Stevens - Disney Channel
Lalaine - Lizzie McGuire - Disney Channel
Scarlett Pomers - Reba - WB
Kelly Salmon - Big Kids - Noggin
Madylin Sweeten - Everybody Loves Raymond - CBS

Best Performance in a TV Comedy Series: Guest Starring Young Actor
★ Shawn Pyfrom - Reba - WB
Bobby Brewer - Malcolm in the Middle - FOX
Eddie Karr - Grounded for Life - FOX
Miles Marsico - Trading Places - BBC America
Kevin Schmidt - Grounded for Life - FOX
Jacob Smith - Becker - CBS

Best Performance in a TV Comedy Series: Guest Starring Young Actress
★ Brooke Anne Smith - Malcolm in the Middle - FOX
Jenna Morrison - The Amanda Show - Nickelodeon
Michelle Trachtenberg - Madtv - FOX

Best Performance in a TV Comedy or Drama Series

Best Performance in a TV Series (Comedy or Drama): Young Actor Age 10 or Under
★ Austin Majors - NYPD Blue - ABC
Myles Jeffrey - ER - NBC
Demetrius Joyette - Doc - PAX
Logan O'Brien - General Hospital - ABC
Sullivan Sweetin - Everybody Loves Raymond - CBS
Kendall Schmidt - Gilmore Girls - WB
Erik Per Sullivan - Malcolm in the Middle - FOX
Hayden Tank - Six Feet Under - HBO

Best Performance in a TV Series (Comedy or Drama): Young Actress Age 10 or Under
★ Ashley Edner - The Huntress - USA
Taylor Atelian - According to Jim - ABC
Skye McCole Bartusiak - Touched by an Angel - CBS
Billi Bruno - According to Jim - ABC
Parker McKenna Posey - My Wife and Kids - ABC
Brittany Tiplady - Night Visions - FOX

Best Ensemble Performance

Best Ensemble in a TV Series (Comedy or Drama)
★ Degrassi: The Next Generation - CTV/Epitome PicturesSarah Barrable-Tishauer, Shane Kippel, Lauren Collins, Miriam McDonald, Melissa McIntyre, Ryan Cooley, Christina Schmidt, Jake Goldsbie, Cassie Steele, Aubrey Graham, Daniel ClarkThe Brothers García - Nickelodeon
Alvin Alvarez, Bobby Gonzales, Jeffrey Licon, Vaneza Leza Pitynski
Lizzie McGuire - Disney Channel
Hilary Duff, Lalaine, Adam Lamberg, Jake Thomas, Ashlie Brillault
Malcolm in the Middle - FOX
Frankie Muniz, Justin Berfield, Erik Per Sullivan, Craig Lamar Traylor

Best Ensemble in a Feature Film
★ An American Rhapsody - Paramount ClassicsScarlett Johansson, Mae Whitman, Kelly Endresz-BanlakiHarry Potter and the Sorcerer's Stone - Warner Bros.
Rupert Grint, Emma Watson, Tom Felton
The Shipping News - Miramax
Alyssa Gainer, Kaitlyn Gainer, Lauren Gainer, Kyle Timothy Smith, Andrew Fowler, Will McAllister

Best Family Entertainment
Best Family Movie or Special (Network or Cable)
★ Prancer Returns - USALife with Judy Garland: Me and My Shadows - ABC
Motocrossed - Disney Channel
My Louisiana Sky - Showtime
Child Star: The Shirley Temple Story - ABC
They Call Me Sirr - Showtime
'Twas the Night - Disney Channel

Best Family TV Drama Series
★ The Education of Max Bickford - CBSAny Day Now - Lifetime
Boston Public - FOX
Pit Pony - CBS/Cochran Entertainment
7th Heaven - WB
Touched by an Angel - CBS

Best Family TV Comedy Series
★ Malcolm in the Middle - FOXDegrassi: The Next Generation - CTV/Epitome Pictures
Grounded for Life - FOX
Reba - WB
The Simpsons - FOX

Best Family Feature Film - Drama
★ I Am Sam - New Line CinemaAn American Rhapsody - Paramount Classics
Harry Potter and the Sorcerer's Stone - Warner Bros.
Hearts in Atlantis - Warner Bros.
The Lord of the Rings: The Fellowship of the Ring - New Line Cinema
The Others - Miramax

Best Family Feature Film - Comedy
★ The Princess Diaries - Walt DisneyCats & Dogs - Warner Bros.
Ghost World - MGM
Kids World - Blue Steel Releasing
Legally Blonde - MGM
Serendipity - Miramax
Spy Kids - Miramax

Best Family Feature Film - Animation
★ Shrek - DreamWorksAtlantis: The Lost Empire - Walt Disney
Jimmy Neutron: Boy Genius - Nickelodeon
Monsters, Inc. - Walt Disney
Blue's Big Musical Movie - Nickelodeon

Special awards
Best Young Actor in an International Film
★ Fernando Tielve - The Devil's Backbone (El Espinazo del Diablo) (Spain) - Directed by: Guillermo del Toro, Distributed by: Sony Pictures ClassicsBest Young Actress in an International Film
★ Aleksandra Gietner - Hi, Tereska (Czesc Tereska) (Poland) - Directed by: Robert Gliński, Produced by: Propaganda AGBest International Family Film
★ Taliesin Jones (Wales) - Starring: John-Paul Macleod as "Taliesin", Directed by: Martin Duffy, Produced by: Snake River Films, Distributed by: Impact EntertainmentOutstanding Young International Performers
★ The Mini Beats (Germany)Most Promising Young Newcomer
★ Rupert Grint (England) - "Ron Weasley" from Warner Brothers' Harry Potter and the Sorcerer's Stone

Outstanding Young Performer in Live Theater
★ Christopher Massey - From the Los Angeles production of Disney's The Lion King

Outstanding Young Voice-Over
★ Aria Noelle Curzon - The voice of "Ducky" in Universal's The Land Before Time (1997–2001)

Outstanding Young Performer in a National Commercial Featuring Youth
★ Tyler Patrick Jones - "Hallmark Greeting Cards"

The Michael Landon Award

Community Service to Youth
★ Promises - Documentary directed by: Justine Shapiro, B.Z. Goldberg, Carlos Bolado; Produced by: Promises Film Project

The Jackie Coogan Award

Outstanding Contribution to Youth Through Motion Pictures
★ ''Tir Nan Og - Short film directed by: Danica DeCosto, Starring: Sarah SwanbergThe Mickey Rooney Award
Former Child Star Life Achievement Award
★ Alison Arngrim - For her role as "Nellie Oleson" in the TV series Little House on the Prairie'' (1974–1981).

References

External links
Official site

Young Artist Awards ceremonies
2001 film awards
2001 television awards
2002 in California
2002 in American cinema
2002 in American television